Barsalou is a French surname, of Catalan origin (it corresponds phonetically to the Barceló surname), with various spellings including Barsolou, Barselou, and Barcelo, and may refer to:

Lawrence W. Barsalou (born 1951), American psychologist,
Jean-Baptiste Barsalou (1706–1776), master tanner from Montreal
Joseph Barsalou (physician) (1600–1660), French apothecary and physician
Joseph Barsalou (businessman) (1822–1897), businessman and politician from Montreal
Paul Barselou (born 1922), American actor

See also 
 Barceló, a Catalan surname